Peter Leonard may refer to:

 Peter Leonard (journalist) (1942–2008), Australian journalist and newsreader
 Peter Leonard (author), American author of crime novels
 Peter Leonard (footballer), Scottish footballer
 Peter Leonard (priest) Archdeacon of the Isle of Wight since 2019